Tobias Peter "Tobbe" Blom (born 28 September 1975) is a Swedish TV host on TV4 and magician. He is well-known under his stage name Tobbe Trollkarl.

Tobbe was the host of Idol 2005 along Johan Wiman and has also done a kids show for morning TV on TV4. In 2007 he danced in the hit show Let's Dance and became first runner up after Martin Lidberg. Tobbe was a judge on the TV4 show Talang in 2007 and 2008, and hosted seasons 2009 – 2011.

He has provided the Swedish-dubbing voice of Spyro for The Legend of Spyro: A New Beginning, The Legend of Spyro: The Eternal Night, and The Legend of Spyro: Dawn of the Dragon. In 2013, he won the title for Kändishoppet, the Swedish version of the international reality television series Celebrity Splash!.

References

External links
This is the jury, Tv4.se
Tobbe during lets dance
Tobbe in Idol 2005

Living people
1975 births
Swedish magicians
Swedish male voice actors
Swedish television personalities